The Anglo-Portuguese Treaty of 1373 was signed on 16 June 1373 between King Edward III of England and King Ferdinand and Queen Eleanor of Portugal.  It established a treaty of "perpetual friendships, unions [and] alliances" between the two seafaring nations. It is the oldest continuous treaty in effect to this day.

It was reinforced throughout history, including in 1386, 1643, 1654, 1660, 1661, 1703, 1815, and by a secret declaration in 1899. It was recognized in the Treaties of Arbitration in the 20th century between Britain and Portugal in 1904 and 1914.

The treaty was temporarily void during the Iberian Union from 1580 to 1640, when the monarchies of Spain and Portugal were in a dynastic union. However, with Portugal's restoration of independence, the alliance returned and came to a new height during the Napoleonic Wars when the British sent their best general, the Duke of Wellington, to sap Napoleon's armies in the Peninsular War.

It was activated again during the Second World War, whereupon the Portuguese remained neutral, in agreement with Britain, which did not want to bring the war into the Iberian Peninsula. This lasted until 1943, when, after three months' negotiations, it was fully reactivated by the National Government of Winston Churchill and Portugal. Britain was accorded aerodrome and nautical facilities in the Portuguese Azores to help combat the U-boat threat. The British also cited the treaty during the 1982 Falklands War.

Text

The original text of the treaty is in the Latin language.  A famous passage in the treaty assures that:

Second World War
In 1943, the Portuguese Government leased to Britain what became a major Allied air and naval base in the Portuguese islands, the Azores. Prime Minister Winston Churchill recounted reporting on the lease to the House of Commons:

"I have an announcement", I said, "to make to the House arising out of the treaty signed between this country and Portugal in the year 1373 between His Majesty King Edward III and King Ferdinand and Queen Eleanor of Portugal."
I spoke in a level voice, and made a pause to allow the House to take in the date, 1373. As this soaked in there was something like a gasp. I do not suppose any such continuity of relations between two Powers has ever been, or will ever be, set forth in the ordinary day-to-day work of British diplomacy.

See also
Military alliance
List of military alliances
List of treaties
Treaty of Windsor (1386)
Anglo-Portuguese Alliance
Anglo-Portuguese Treaty of 1878
Treaty of Tagilde

Sources
"Closing the Ring", Churchill, Sir Winston Spencer, 1951.

References 

Treaties of medieval England
14th century in Portugal
1373 in England
1370s treaties
Treaties of the Kingdom of Portugal
Treaties of England
England–Portugal relations
Edward III of England
Anglo-Portuguese treaties